Helène Whittaker (born 13 March 1958) is a Canadian-Norwegian archaeologist and scholar of antiquity. She is known for her work on the Bronze Age Aegean, ancient Greek and Roman language and culture, and Early Christianity. , she is professor of Classical Archaeology and Ancient History at the University of Gothenburg in Sweden.

Education and career
Whittaker studied languages and archeology at the University of Bergen, finishing her candidata philologiae in 1983. She continued her studies at the University of Tromsø and the University of Toronto, completing a Ph.D. in 1996.

Having been a senior lecturer at the University of Tromsø in 1994–2004, she was promoted to full professor at the same university in 2004. In 2009, she was the Peter W. Warren visiting professor in Aegean prehistory at the University of Bristol. In 2013, she accepted the position as professor of Classical Archaeology and Ancient History at the department of Historical Studies at the University of Gothenburg. Together with Maria Vaïopoulou, she directed the Greek-Swedish Vlochos Archaeological Project at Thessalian Vlochos in 2016–2018.

Work 
Whittaker is known for her work on archaeology and antiquity. A portion of her research examines the history of games, and she has commented on the historical significance of hnefatafl, an ancient board game that was common during the early Middle Ages.

Selected publications

Awards and honours 
In 2014 Whittaker was named to the Royal Society of Sciences and Letters in Gothenburg. She was elected as a member of the Academia Europaea in 2020.

References

1958 births
Living people
Canadian archaeologists
Norwegian archaeologists
Women archaeologists
Academic staff of the University of Gothenburg
University of Bergen alumni